Radomir "Rade" Marković (14 October 1921 – 10 September 2010) was a Serbian actor. He performed in more than ninety films. He was married to actress Olivera Marković from 1945 until they divorced in 1964. After the divorce he had a long affair with the Bulgarian actress Nevena Kokanova who he met during the filming of The Peach Thief.

Selected filmography

Awards
 Dobričin prsten (1998)
 Statuette of Joakim Vujić (2005)

References

External links

 

Serbian male film actors
Serbian male television actors
Serbian male stage actors
Serbian male voice actors
Golden Arena winners
Male actors from Belgrade
1921 births
2010 deaths
20th-century Serbian male actors
Laureates of the Ring of Dobrica
Yugoslav male actors